Azghan (also Romanized as Āzghān and Āz̄ghān; also known as Ārghān, Askol, and Azgan) is a village in Azghan Rural District of the Central District of Ahar County, East Azerbaijan province, Iran. At the 2006 census, its population was 1,132 in 290 households. The following census in 2011 counted 1,061 people in 296 households. The latest census in 2016 showed a population of 1,011 people in 346 households; it was the largest village in its rural district.

References 

Ahar County

Populated places in East Azerbaijan Province

Populated places in Ahar County